"Fireflies" is the debut single from American electronica project Owl City's album Ocean Eyes. Frontman Adam Young wrote how he enjoyed the fireflies in his hometown of Owatonna, Minnesota, and the rest of the track about seeing fireflies while he was awake with insomnia, with Matt Thiessen also producing and providing guest vocals. The song is built around a "bleepy" synthline and includes lyrics about insomnia, fireflies and summer.

The song topped the Billboard Hot 100 for two non-consecutive weeks. Internationally, the song also topped the charts in Australia, Belgium, Denmark, Finland, the Netherlands, Norway, Ireland, Sweden and the United Kingdom. "Fireflies" was Owl City's only top forty hit in the United States until three years later when "Good Time", a duet with Canadian singer Carly Rae Jepsen, charted at No. 8. It has been covered by Christina Grimmie, Cheryl Cole and others.

"Fireflies" is featured in the video game Disney Sing It: Party Hits, and was used in the promotional video for EyePet. It is available as downloadable content for Guitar Hero 5, Guitar Hero: Warriors of Rock and Rock Band 3.

Composition
"Fireflies" is centered on Young's struggle with insomnia; he first developed the song "awake in the early hours of the morning" to occupy his mind. It was also inspired by a camping trip he took up to a "totally rustic and kind of remote lake in northern Minnesota"; he tried to emulate the experience of seeing a meteor shower that gave him "a cool idea of shooting stars being fireflies." Young was living with his parents, and recorded most of the song in their unfinished basement. The song is layered with dozens of instrumental tracks, including its drum loop, piano, organ, synthesizer, vibraphone, violin, viola, and cello, which was performed by a cellist Young hired. He recorded electric guitar overlays but did not own an amplifier, so he plugged the instrument directly into his computer.

Critical reception

"Fireflies" was generally well received by music critics. Ben Sheehan of Billboard called the track, "a welcome refreshment." Praising the song for being "uniquely constructed," he also added, "it's the pianos and guitars that really crack the song wide open." In another positive review, Nick Levine of Digital Spy remarked, "there's nothing twee or cutesy about the socking great chorus Young unleashes here." Caroline Sullivan at The Guardian called the tune "unfeasibly bouncy". 

The song was widely compared to the music of synth-pop duo the Postal Service; Young denied it was his goal to emulate their sound or vocalist Ben Gibbard. Ian Cohen of Pitchfork called it an extraordinarily "obvious" lift of their sound. Gabriela Tully Claymore, writing for Stereogum in 2017, remembered it as "diet Postal Service".

Chart performance
"Fireflies", when featured as iTunes' free "Single of the Week," garnered 650,000 downloads, influencing Universal Republic to move Ocean Eyes release date from September 1, 2009, to July 28. The song debuted on the Billboard Hot 100 in early-September at No. 97. The song reached No. 1 during its tenth week, becoming Owl City's first No. 1 single. The song stayed at No. 1 for two non-consecutive weeks, in the top ten for fifteen weeks and on the Hot 100 for 31 weeks. "Fireflies" contributed to sales of the album Ocean Eyes, and was credited as being responsible for its entry to the top ten on the U.S. Billboard 200. On the Billboard Hot 100 2009 year-end chart, it was ranked sixtieth. On the Billboard Hot 100 2010 year-end chart, it was ranked thirtieth. The RIAA certified "Fireflies" 3× Platinum in June 2010.

The song attained success worldwide. In the United Kingdom, the song entered at No. 50 on the UK Singles Chart due to early download sales from a fake version that was leaked onto iTunes. The song would go on to make a 48-place jump to number two the following week, beaten only to the top by "Replay" by Iyaz. The following week, it rose to number one and topped the chart for three consecutive weeks. On January 2, 2011, it was revealed that "Fireflies" was the 20th most downloaded song of all time in the UK. As of September 2017, the song has sold over 844,000 copies in the UK.

In Australia, the song entered at No. 38 and on the week of January 10, 2010, it topped the chart. In Japan, the song peaked at No. 3 and was ranked sixteenth on the 2010 year-end chart, the highest ranking for an international song for 2010. It reached No. 1 in Denmark, Ireland, Sweden, Australia, the United Kingdom and the Netherlands (for 10 weeks) and the top ten in Austria, Belgium, Canada, Poland, Finland, Germany, New Zealand, Norway, Portugal, and Switzerland. The song was ranked 89th on VH1's 'Top 100 songs of the new millennium'.

Music video
The music video for "Fireflies" was directed by Steve Hoover. It features Adam Young playing the song on a Lowrey spinet organ in a toy-filled bedroom, where most of the toys (including an astronaut; a Tyrannosaurus rex; a Speak & Spell; toy cars, including one based on the UK children's TV character, Brum; and a blimp) come to life. Most of the toys are older model toys, with most of them from the 1970s and 1980s (the exceptions being a Robosapien and a Roboraptor). There are also vintage household devices such as a black-and-white television and a record player. As Young plays the organ, he activates a "magic" button on his organ, and the aforementioned toys come to life. As the song progresses towards the end, toys return to normal one by one until he turns off the magic button. The video ends with turning off his organ as the camera fades to black.

The video premiered on Myspace but was leaked onto Dailymotion sometime before, and YouTube soon after.

Legacy
"Fireflies" was an inescapable hit; Spin columnist Rob Arcand wrote that the tune "cascaded throughout the world, inescapable in public spaces in the years that followed. Something about its mawkish, saccharine lyrics were so flawlessly inoffensive as to make it the perfect song for light-rock radio, and the track rippled through airwaves in malls, airports, commercials, and public transit until even the most earnest fans grew a little tired." American electronic producer James Ferraro, commonly credited with pioneering the electronic genre vaporwave, called "Fireflies" the best song of the 21st century, interpreting it on Twitter as having themes of mass surveillance and "circadian rhythm disorder from ever present [sic] devices".

Internet meme
In May 2017, the song was repurposed as an Internet meme, usually involving the song being played at an extremely loud volume or being remixed to fit a certain theme. Another variant of the meme involved writing a pun for the line "You would not believe your eyes, if ten million fireflies". The song received further notability in June when Owl City was asked to interpret the lyric "I get a thousand hugs from 10,000 lightning bugs."

Awards and nominations

Track listing

Charts

Weekly charts

Year-end charts

Certifications

Release history

See also
List of best-selling singles in Australia
List of Hot 100 number-one singles of 2009 (U.S.)
List of Hot Adult Top 40 Tracks number-one singles of 2010
Dutch Top 40 number-one hits of 2009
List of number-one singles in Australia in 2010
List of number-one singles from the 2010s (UK)
List of number-one singles of 2010 (Ireland)
List of number-one singles (Sweden)

References

External links

2009 debut singles
Owl City songs
Cheryl (singer) songs
Dutch Top 40 number-one singles
Irish Singles Chart number-one singles
2000s ballads
Number-one singles in Australia
Number-one singles in Denmark
Number-one singles in Scotland
Number-one singles in Sweden
UK Singles Chart number-one singles
Songs written by Adam Young
2009 songs
Universal Republic Records singles
Synth-pop ballads
Internet memes introduced in 2017